The 2020–21 UEFA Nations League was the second season of the UEFA Nations League, an international association football competition involving the men's national teams of the 55 member associations of UEFA. The competition was held from September to November 2020 (league phase), October 2021 (Nations League Finals) and March 2022 (relegation play-outs).

Portugal were the defending champions, having won the inaugural 2019 finals. However, they failed to qualify for the 2021 finals after finishing second in their group behind France. None of the teams that had qualified for the previous UEFA Nations League Finals qualified for the 2021 edition.

France won the final 2–1 against Spain for their first UEFA Nations League title.

Format
On 24 September 2019, UEFA announced that a revised format would be used for the 2020–21 edition, the second season of the competition. The 55 UEFA national teams were divided into four leagues, with Leagues A, B and C featuring sixteen teams each, divided into four groups of four teams. League D featured seven teams divided into two groups, with one containing four teams and the other containing three. The teams were allocated to leagues based on the 2018–19 UEFA Nations League overall ranking. Each team now played six matches within their group, except for one group in League D that played four, using the home-and-away round-robin format on double matchdays in September, October and November 2020. This format ensured that for almost all groups, teams in the same group played their last matches at the same time. It also increased the number of total league phase matches from 138 to 162 and minimised the number of friendly matches.

In the top division, League A, teams competed to become the UEFA Nations League champions. The four group winners of League A qualified for the Nations League Finals, which was played in a knockout format consisting of the semi-finals, third place play-off and final. The semi-final pairings were determined by means of an open draw. Host country Italy was selected among the four qualified teams by the UEFA Executive Committee, with the winners of the final crowned as the Nations League champions. The video assistant referee (VAR) system was used in the Nations League Finals.

Teams also competed for promotion and relegation to a higher or lower league. The group winners from Leagues B, C and D were promoted, while the last-placed teams of each group in Leagues A and B were relegated. As League C had four groups while League D had only two, the two League C teams that were to be relegated were determined by play-outs in March 2022. Based on the Nations League overall ranking of the fourth-placed teams, the first-ranked team faced the fourth-ranked team and the second-ranked team faced the third-ranked team. Two ties were played over two legs, with the higher-ranked team hosting the second leg. The team that scored more goals on aggregate over the two legs remained in League C, while the loser was relegated to League D. If the aggregate score was level, extra time was played (the away goals rule was not applied). If still tied after extra time, a penalty shoot-out was used to decide the winner. The away goals rule was originally to be used, but was abolished by the UEFA Executive Committee on 16 December 2021.

Tiebreakers for group ranking
If two or more teams in the same group were equal on points on completion of the league phase, the following tie-breaking criteria were applied:
 Higher number of points obtained in the matches played among the teams in question;
 Superior goal difference in matches played among the teams in question;
 Higher number of goals scored in the matches played among the teams in question;
 Higher number of goals scored away from home in the matches played among the teams in question;
 If, after having applied criteria 1 to 4, teams still had an equal ranking, criteria 1 to 4 were reapplied exclusively to the matches between the teams in question to determine their final rankings. If this procedure did not lead to a decision, criteria 6 to 10 applied;
 Superior goal difference in all group matches;
 Higher number of goals scored in all group matches;
 Higher number of away goals scored in all group matches;
 Higher number of wins in all group matches;
 Higher number of away wins in all group matches;
 Lower disciplinary points total in all group matches (1 point for a single yellow card, 3 points for a red card as a consequence of two yellow cards, 3 points for a direct red card, 4 points for a yellow card followed by a direct red card).
 Position in the 2020–21 UEFA Nations League access list.
Notes

Criteria for league ranking
Individual league rankings were established according to the following criteria:
 Position in the group;
 Higher number of points;
 Superior goal difference;
 Higher number of goals scored;
 Higher number of goals scored away from home;
 Higher number of wins;
 Higher number of wins away from home;
 Lower disciplinary points total (1 point for a single yellow card, 3 points for a red card as a consequence of two yellow cards, 3 points for a direct red card, 4 points for a yellow card followed by a direct red card).
 Position in the 2020–21 UEFA Nations League access list.

In order to rank teams in League D, which was composed of different sized groups, the results against the fourth-placed team in Group D1 were not taken into account for the purposes of comparing teams placed first, second and third in their respective groups.

The ranking of the top four teams in League A was determined by their finish in the Nations League Finals (first to fourth).

Criteria for overall ranking
The overall UEFA Nations League rankings were established as follows:
 The 16 League A teams were ranked 1st to 16th according to their league rankings.
 The 16 League B teams were ranked 17th to 32nd according to their league rankings.
 The 16 League C teams were ranked 33rd to 48th according to their league rankings.
 The 7 League D teams were ranked 49th to 55th according to their league rankings.

2022 FIFA World Cup qualification

The Nations League was partially linked with European qualification for the 2022 FIFA World Cup in Qatar, with the format confirmed by the UEFA Executive Committee during their meeting in Nyon, Switzerland on 4 December 2019. The qualifying structure depended on results from the Nations League, although to a lesser degree than the UEFA Euro 2020 qualifying play-offs. The ten group winners after the first round (group stage) qualified directly for the World Cup. Then, the second round (play-offs) was contested by the ten group runners-up, along with the best two Nations League group winners, based on the Nations League overall ranking, that finished outside the top two of their qualifying group. The play-offs were split into three play-off paths, played in two single-match knockout rounds (semi-finals and finals, with the home teams to be drawn), from which an additional three teams also qualified.

Effects of the COVID-19 pandemic
Due to the COVID-19 pandemic in Europe, the UEFA Executive Committee approved on 28 August 2020 the following principles for the league phase of the 2020–21 UEFA Nations League:
If a team could not field the minimum required number of players (at least 13 players including at least one goalkeeper) due to positive SARS-CoV-2 tests and the match could not be rescheduled, the team responsible for the match not taking place were considered to have forfeited the match and lost 0–3.
If UEFA came to the conclusion that both or none of the teams were responsible for the match not taking place, the outcome of the match was decided by drawing of lots, either home win 1–0, home loss 0–1 or draw 0–0, carried out by the UEFA administration.

On 24 September 2020, UEFA announced that five substitutions would be permitted in Nations League matches during the October and November 2020 international windows. On 31 March 2021, the use of five substitutes was extended to the Nations League Finals in October 2021 and the League C relegation play-outs in March 2022, with these knockout matches permitting a sixth substitution should the match go to extra time. However, each team was only given three opportunities to make substitutions during matches, excluding substitutions made at half-time, before the start of extra time and at half-time in extra time. During the September 2020 window, only three substitutions had been permitted.

All matches played in September 2020 were required by UEFA to be held behind closed doors due to the COVID-19 pandemic in Europe. On 1 October 2020, UEFA announced the partial return of spectators to matches beginning in October 2020, restricted to a maximum of 30 percent of the respective stadium capacity. However, the return of spectators was subject to the decision of local authorities, with regional limits taking precedence over UEFA's maximum allowed capacity. Away supporters were not allowed at the venues. Social distancing was mandatory for spectators and additional precautionary measures (such as face masks) were implemented in accordance with local regulations.

Schedule
Below was the schedule of the 2020–21 UEFA Nations League.

The Nations League Finals, originally scheduled for 2–6 June 2021, were moved to October 2021 following the rescheduling of UEFA Euro 2020 to June and July 2021 due to the COVID-19 pandemic. The scheduling of the league phase was reviewed by the UEFA Executive Committee during their meeting on 17 June 2020. At the meeting, UEFA decided to adjust the match schedule for October and November 2020 in order for an additional match to be played in each window. This allowed for the UEFA Euro 2020 qualifying play-offs, along with the postponed March 2020 international friendlies, to be played on 7–8 October and 11–12 November 2020. Therefore, matchdays 3–6, which originally would spread over three days each during 8–13 October and 12–17 November 2020, would now spread over only two days. The changes to the International Match Calendar for October and November 2020, which extended each window by one day, were approved by the FIFA Council on 25 June 2020.

The original fixture list was confirmed by UEFA on 3 March 2020 following the draw. However, due to the change of the league phase calendar, a revised schedule for the October and November 2020 fixtures was released by UEFA on 26 June 2020.

The relegation play-outs of League C were scheduled on the same dates as the 2022 FIFA World Cup qualifying play-offs. If one or more of the teams due to participate in the relegation play-outs had also qualified for the World Cup qualifying play-offs, the relegation play-outs would have been cancelled and the teams in League C ranked 47th and 48th in the Nations League overall ranking would have been automatically relegated.

Seeding

All 55 UEFA national teams entered the competition. Due to the format change of the competition, no teams were actually relegated from the 2018–19 season. In addition to the group winners, the second-placed teams in Leagues C and D, along with the best-ranked third-placed team of League D, were also promoted.

In the 2020–21 access list, UEFA ranked teams based on the 2018–19 Nations League overall ranking, with a slight modification: teams that were originally relegated in the previous season were ranked immediately below teams promoted prior to the format change. The seeding pots for the league phase were based on the access list ranking. The seeding pots, draw procedure and fixture list procedures were confirmed by the UEFA Executive Committee during their meeting in Nyon, Switzerland on 4 December 2019.

The draw for the league phase took place at the Beurs van Berlage Conference Centre in Amsterdam, Netherlands on 3 March 2020, 18:00 CET. While the draw typically had restrictions for prohibited clashes, winter venues and excessive travel, no conditions applied to the draw given the allocation of the teams to both leagues and pots.

League A

Group A1

Group A2

Group A3

Group A4

Nations League Finals

Bracket

Semi-finals

Third-place play-off

Final

Top goalscorers

League B

Group B1

Group B2

Group B3

Group B4

Top goalscorers

League C

Group C1

Group C2

Group C3

Group C4

Relegation play-outs

Top goalscorers

League D

Group D1

Group D2

Top goalscorers

Overall ranking
The results of each team were used to calculate the overall ranking of the competition.

2022 World Cup qualification play-offs

The best two Nations League group winners based on the overall ranking that finished outside the top two of their World Cup qualifying group joined the ten group runners-up in the World Cup qualification second round (play-offs).

References

External links

 
2020-21
Nations League
Nations League
September 2020 sports events in Europe
October 2020 sports events in Europe
November 2020 sports events in Europe
October 2021 sports events in Europe
March 2022 sports events in Europe